The Chairman of the Duma of the Khanty-Mani Autonomous Okrug is the presiding officer of that legislature.

Office-holders

Sources 
The Duma of the Khanty-Mani Autonous Okrug

Lists of legislative speakers in Russia
Politics of Khanty-Mansi Autonomous Okrug